Lincoln Township is a township in Scott County, Iowa, USA.  As of the 2000 census, its population was 634.

Geography
According to the USGS, it contains two cemeteries: Kay Family and Miller.

References
 USGS Geographic Names Information System (GNIS)

External links
 US-Counties.com
 City-Data.com

Townships in Scott County, Iowa
Townships in Iowa